Wu Zhen is the name of:

Wu Zhen (historian) ( 11th century), Song dynasty historian
Wu Zhen (painter) (1280–1354), Yuan dynasty painter
Wu Zhen (politician) (born 1958), Chinese politician

See also
Wuzhen, a historic scenic town in Tongxiang, Zhejiang, China